Stat is an American television sitcom that aired six episodes, from April 16 to May 21, 1991, on Tuesday night at 9:30 p.m. Eastern Time, on the American Broadcasting Company network.

Premise
The series centered on the staff of New York City's Hudson Memorial Hospital. The show was a remake of the 1977 sitcom A.E.S. Hudson Street.

Cast
 Dennis Boutsikaris as Dr. Tony Menzies
 Ron Canada as Anderson 'Mary' Roche
 David Marguiles as Leonard Sorkin
 Casey Biggs as Dr. Lewis Doniger
 Cynthia Lea Clark as Nurse C
 Alison La Placa as Dr. Elisabeth Newberry

Episodes

References

External links

1991 American television series debuts
1991 American television series endings
American Broadcasting Company original programming
1990s American sitcoms
Television shows set in Manhattan
1990s American medical television series
English-language television shows
Television series by ABC Studios